Mixtape Messiah is a series of mixtapes by Houston rapper Chamillionaire. The Mixtape Messiah was his first in the series, which was released on February 15, 2004. Featuring 61 tracks over three CDs, this triple mixtape is the longest and most bought mixtape in Texas history. Mixtape Messiah 7 was released on August 4, 2009, and was officially confirmed to be the final mixtape in the series.

History

The Mixtape Messiah (2004) 

King Koopa: The Mixtape Messiah is the first mixtape by Houston rapper Chamillionaire, released in 2004. Featuring 61 tracks over three CDs, this triple album is the longest and most bought mixtape in Texas history.

Track listing 
Disc 1
 "I'm Da' King" - samples "King of the South" by T.I. - Instrumental from "Show Ya Tattoos" by Lil Boosie & Webbie
 "Shut Up (Interlude)"
 "You Got Wrecked" - Instrumental from "Bow Down" by Westside Connection
 "New Name (Interlude)"
 "Who They Want" - Instrumental from "Game Over (Flip)" by Lil' Flip
 "I Mean that There" - Instrumental from "Hold Up" by David Banner
 "Run You out the Game" - Instrumental from "All I Know" by Lil' Flip
 "Not Friendly" - Instrumental from "You Don't Want Drama" by 8Ball & MJG
 "Roll Call"
 "Talk Show (Interlude)"
 "Gun Smoke" - Instrumental from "Hard Not 2 Kill" by Three 6 Mafia
 "Drag 'Em in the River" (featuring Rasaq) - Instrumental from "What U Gon' Do" by Lil Jon & The East Side Boyz
 "What Would You Do" - Instrumental from "Salute U"by G-Unit
 "Switch Styles" - Instrumental from "What Y'all Wanna Do" by Lil' Flip
 "Body Rock" - Instrumental from "Lean Back" by Fat Joe
 "Step into My Room" - Instrumental from "Let's Get Away" by T.I.
 "Answer Machine (Interlude)" - Instrumental from "Is A Playa" by "Guerilla Maab"
 "I'm Busy" - Instrumental from "Is A Playa" by "Guerilla Maab"
 "Put It in Slow Motion" - Instrumental from "Slow Motion" by Juvenile
 "Screw Jamz" - Instrumental from "Slow Jamz" by Twista
 "I Had a Dream" - Instrumental from "A Dream" by Jay-Z
 "The Truth" - Instrumental from "This Can't Be Life" by Jay-Z

Disc 2
 Screwed and Chopped by OG RON C
 "I'm da King (Screwed and Chopped)"
 "Roll Call (Screwed and Chopped)"
 "I'm a Balla (Screwed and Chopped)"
 "Who they Want (Screwed and Chopped)"
 "On Yo Azz (Screwed and Chopped)"
 "What Would You Do (Screwed and Chopped)"
 "Pimp Drill (feat. Color Changin' Click) (Screwed and Chopped)"
 "I Mean That There (Screwed and Chopped)"
 "Run You Out the Game (Screwed and Chopped)"
 "Switch Styles (Screwed and Chopped)"
 "I Had a Dream (Screwed and Chopped)"
 "O.G. Ron C Guttamix (Screwed and Chopped)"
 "Body Rock (Screwed and Chopped)"
 "We on Fire (feat. Color Changin' Click) (Screwed and Chopped)"
 "You Got Wrecked (Screwed and Chopped)"
 "Not Friendly (Screwed and Chopped)"
 "Gun Smoke (Screwed and Chopped)"
 "Answer Machine (Interlude) (feat. O.G. Ron C) (Screwed and Chopped)"

Disc 3
 "Front to Back (featuring Rasaq & Yung Ro)"
 "Who I Be (Rasaq)" - Instrumental from "Look What I Got" by T.I.
 "Gun Smoke (featuring Yung Ro)" - Instrumental from "Hard Not 2 Kill" by Gangsta Boo
 "We Gonna Ride (featuring Rasaq)" - Instrumental from "Badunkadunk" by Twista
 "I Be Comin Down (Screwed) (Rasaq)" - Instrumental from "Don't Make" by 8Ball & MJG
 "Call Some Hoes (featuring Kanye West & Stat Quo)"
 "I Got Hoes (Screwed) (featuring Rasaq)"
 "On Yo Azz"
 "Texas Boys" (Rasaq)
 "Hey Lady" (featuring Big Gem)
 "Pimp Drill"
 "Panky Rang (Interlude) (featuring Rasaq)"
 "Hurtin 'em Bad"
 "We on Fire (featuring The Color Changin' Click)" - Instrumental from "On Fire" by Lloyd Banks
 "I'm a Balla (featuring Play-N-Skillz, Far East & Lumba)"
 "I Tip Down (featuring Rasaq)" - Instrumental from "Who Gives a Fuck Where You From" by Three 6 Mafia
 "Who They Want (featuring Rasaq)" - Instrumental from "Game Over" by Lil' Flip
 "Platinum Stars" (featuring Lil' Flip & Bun B)
 "Tippin' Slow (featuring Rasaq)" - Instrumental from Round Here by Memphis Bleek
 "Still Tippin' (featuring Slim Thug)
 "Weatherman" (featuring Paul Wall)

Mixtape Messiah 2 (2005-2006)

Mixtape Messiah 2 is the second mixtape in the Mixtape Messiah series. It was recorded in 2005, and it was released January 1, 2006.

Track listing
 Guess Who's Back (Intro) 
 Hip Hop Warning 
 She Gonna Already Know 
 Let 'Em Know Lyrics
 Tryin' To Change Me
 Picture Me Rollin'
 Game Gonna Cost A Fee 
 Ridin' Overseas
 Show Me What Ya Got
 Answer Machine 2 
 International Money 
 I Run It 
 Get Ya Umbrellas Out 
 Man, Hold Up 
 Roll Call Reloaded

Mixtape Messiah 3 (2006-2007)

Mixtape Messiah 3 is the third mixtape by southern rapper Chamillionaire. It was released as a free download on Chamillionaire's official website on July 18, 2007 at 11:00 P.M. EDT to promote his album Ultimate Victory, then scheduled for release three months later.

Track listing

Mixtape Messiah 4 (2007-2008)

Mixtape Messiah 4 is the fourth mixtape by Chamillionaire in his Mixtape Messiah series. It is a two-disc set that was released on August 27, 2008.

Track listing
Disc 1

Disc 2

Mixtape Messiah 5 (2008)

Mixtape Messiah 5 is the fifth mixtape by Chamillionaire is his Mixtape Messiah series. It was released in 2008.

Track listing
 Intro (4:15)
 Keep Hating,Pt. II (2:02)
 Swagga' Like Koopa (4:19)
 I Got (2:43)
 Internet Nerds Brother (2:50)
 Chop Chop Chop (4:05)
 The One to Hate (2:32)
 All I Got Is Pain (3:02)
 Act Right (2:34)
 Freeway (1:55)
 Car Windows (2:59)
 Car Skit (3:00)
 Really Isn't Fair (2:17)
 Ran Out of Auto-Tune (1:32)
 Can't Get Enough (3:16)
 Answering Machine Skit (1:12)
 Pimp Talk (2:14)
 Ready For Whatever (4:10)
 Do Ya Thing (2:32)
 Solo (Break) (4:37)
 Texas 4 Life (4:37)
 No Hate (2:49)

Mixtape Messiah 6 (2008-2009)

Mixtape Messiah 6 is the sixth mixtape by Chamillionaire in his Mixtape Messiah series. It was recorded in 2008, and it was later released on January 5, 2009.

Track listing
 Best Rapper Alive 
 Love of Money 
 Throwdest in the Game 
 Mixtape Murder 
 The Evaluation 
 One Day 
 Track Wrecka 
 Everything 
 Switch Styles Reloaded 
 Murder They Wrote 
 For The Moment 
 Shine So Clean 
 Judge Judy
 Shawty (Feat. Chalie Boy) Produced by @LoudNoyz

Mixtape Messiah 7 (2009)

Mixtape Messiah 7 is the seventh mixtape by southern rapper Chamillionaire. It is also the final mixtape in his Mixtape Messiah series.

Track listing

References

External links

Sequel albums
2004 mixtape albums
2005 mixtape albums
2006 mixtape albums
2007 mixtape albums
2008 mixtape albums
2009 mixtape albums
Chamillionaire albums
Chamillitary Entertainment albums